Kris Kahler (born 13 February 1983) is an Australian former professional rugby league footballer who played in the 2000s. He previously played for the Gold Coast Titans in the National Rugby League competition, where he was a part of the inaugural Gold Coast Titans squad. He also played for the Brisbane Broncos and Canberra Raiders.

Playing career
Kahler played for the French Rugby League team Pia Donkeys in the Elite One Championship in the 2009 season.

In 2009, he signed with Gateshead Thunder along with Paul Franze and Nick Youngquest.

Kahler left Gateshead Thunder just before the club went in to administration at the end of the 2009 season returning to Australia to play for the Redcliffe Dolphins. Rumours he would coach at Gateshead Thunder would not come to fruition.

References

External links
 Redcliffe Dolphins profile

1983 births
Living people
Australian rugby league players
Baroudeurs de Pia XIII players
Brisbane Broncos players
Canberra Raiders players
Gold Coast Titans players
Newcastle Thunder players
Redcliffe Dolphins players
Rugby league players from Gympie
Rugby league props
Rugby league second-rows